Sargasso Sea is an album by the English band Pram, released in 1995.

Critical reception

The Orlando Sentinel wrote that the "cinematic sweep of Pram's work is sometimes reminiscent of Portishead, but there's more hallucinatory detail." The Colorado Daily stated that "as vocalist Rosie Cuckston breathes out her melodies, wavy synths, tight snare hits and funky bass lines move the songs along, taking the listener on an undersea adventure."

Track listing

Personnel 
Rosie Cuckston – vocals, keyboards
Matt Eaton - guitar, bass guitar, sampler, keyboards
Sam Owen –  guitar, bass guitar, keyboards
Max Simpson – keyboards, sampler
Daren Garratt – drums, percussion
Mr Verdigris Horn – trumpet
Pram – recording

References

External links 
 

1995 albums
Pram (band) albums
Too Pure albums